Boyer Valley Community School District (BVCSD) is a school district headquartered in Dunlap, Iowa.

The district occupies sections of Crawford, Harrison, Monona, and Shelby counties. The district serves Dunlap, Arion, and Dow City.

History
It was formed on July 1, 1994, by a merger of the Dunlap and Dow City-Arion school districts.

Circa 1997 the Boyer Valley district and the East Monona Community School District began a grade-sharing program. On September 9, 2003, the residents of the Boyer Valley and East Monona districts voted on a plan to consolidate the districts. Even though Boyer Valley residents voted in favor on a 385 to 30 basis, the East Monona residents voted it down on a 313 to 178 basis.

On July 1, 2004, the East Monona district was dissolved, with portions going to several districts. Boyer Valley absorbed 10% of the former East Monona district.

Schools
Boyer Valley Elementary School
Boyer Valley Middle/High School

Boyer Valley  High School

Athletics
The Bulldogs compete in the Rolling Valley Conference in the following sports:

Baseball
Basketball (boys and girls)
Cross Country (boys and girls)
Football
Golf
 Girls' 2004 Class 1A State Champions
Softball
Track and Field (boys and girls)
Volleyball
Wrestling

References

External links
 Boyer Valley Community School District

School districts in Iowa
School districts established in 1994
1994 establishments in Iowa
Education in Crawford County, Iowa
Education in Harrison County, Iowa
Education in Monona County, Iowa
Education in Shelby County, Iowa